Prince Alexander Magnus Friedrich Barclay de Tolly-Weymarn (Alexander Petrovich Barklay-de-Tolli-Veymarn; December 22, 1824 – May 8, 1905), born as Alexander Magnus Friedrich von Weymarn, was a Baltic German military commander who served in the Imperial Russian Army.

Life and family 
He was a member of the Baltic German nobility, and the son of General Wilhelm Peter Jost von Weymarn (1793–1846) and his wife, Christina Augusta von Lueder (1803–1887). He married Marie Friederike von Seddeler in 1849 and had three children: daughters Alexandrine "Ada" Auguste Olga Barclay de Tolly-Weymarn and Marie "Mira" Georgia Augusta Barclay de Tolly-Weymarn, and son Ludwig Alexander Michael Barclay de Tolly-Weymarn.

His maternal grandmother was the sister of Prince Michael Andreas Barclay de Tolly, a very prominent military commander who was made a count in 1813 and a prince in 1815 by Alexander I of Russia. After the extinction of the original Barclay de Tolly princely line upon the death in 1871 of Prince Michael's son (Magnus Barclay de Tolly), Alexander von Weymarn was allowed to assume the title of Prince Barclay de Tolly-Weymarn in 1872, by permission of Alexander II of Russia.

Honours

Russian orders and decorations 
 Knight of the Imperial Order of Saint Anna, 3rd Class, 1849; 2nd Class, 1855; 1st Class, 1864
 Knight of the Imperial Order of Saint Vladimir, 4th Class, 1856; 3rd Class, 1860; 2nd Class, 1869
 Knight of the Imperial Order of Saint Stanislaus, 1st Class, 1861
 Knight of the Imperial Order of the White Eagle
 Knight of the Imperial Order of Saint Alexander Nevsky, 1886

Foreign orders and decorations 
 House and Merit Order of Peter Frederick Louis, 3rd Class
 Grand Cross of the Order of the Dannebrog, 13 December 1867
 Knight of the Order of the Red Eagle, 1st Class, 7 May 1873
 Knight of the Order of the Iron Crown, 1st Class, 1874
 Commander Grand Cross of the Royal Order of the Sword, 19 July 1875
 Grand Cross of the House Order of the Wendish Crown, with Golden Crown, 16 February 1876

References

Bibliography 
 Baltische Historische Kommission (Hrsg.): Weymarn, Alexander Magnus Friedrich v., seit 31. Mai 1872 Fürst Barclay de Tolly-W. In: BBLd – Baltisches Biographisches Lexikon digital. Göttingen 2012.
 Nicolai von Essen (Hrsg.): Genealogisches Handbuch der Oeselschen Ritterschaft. Tartu, 1935, S. 443.
 Genealogisches Handbuch der Baltischen Ritterschaften. (Neue Folge), Band 2, Hamburg 2012, S. 28–31.
 Genealogisches Handbuch der baltischen Ritterschaften. Teil 2, 3: Estland. Görlitz 1930, S. 274f.

External links 
 Familie Barclay-de-Tolly-Weymarn on geneall.net
 Familie Barclay-de-Tolly-Weymarn on geni.com

1824 births
1905 deaths
Baltic nobility
Baltic-German people
Grand Crosses of the Order of the Dannebrog
Commanders Grand Cross of the Order of the Sword
People from Pärnu
People from the Governorate of Livonia
Recipients of the Order of Saint Stanislaus (Russian), 1st class
Recipients of the Order of St. Anna, 1st class
Recipients of the Order of St. Anna, 3rd class
Recipients of the Order of St. Anna, 4th class
Recipients of the Order of St. Vladimir, 2nd class
Recipients of the Order of St. Vladimir, 3rd class
Recipients of the Order of St. Vladimir, 4th class
Recipients of the Order of the White Eagle (Russia)
Russian military personnel of the Russo-Turkish War (1877–1878)
Russian princes